Maxime Brunfaut (1909–2003) was a Belgian architect.

Brussels Central Station was completed by Maxime Brunfaut  following the death of architect Victor Horta in 1947.  Brunfaut added a new train line to the national airport and several underground passageways for pedestrians to Horta's design.

References

1909 births
2003 deaths
Belgian architects
People from Schaerbeek